was released on December 19, 1990 in Japan for the Family Computer. A North American release was planned but ultimately scrapped. The game was known in Poland, Russia and other non-NES countries via Famiclones

Summary
This video game is a variation of the famous fairy tale, "Jack and the Beanstalk". It is a challenging platform game that plays similar to Mega Man. Beans help to improve the player's attack, while springs are used to improve his jumping height.

References

1990 video games
Asmik Ace Entertainment games
Japan-exclusive video games
Nintendo Entertainment System games
Nintendo Entertainment System-only games
Video games about children
Video games about plants
Video games developed in Japan